Bruce Kangwa (born 24 February 1988) is a Zimbabwean international footballer who plays for Azam as a left back.

Career
Kangwa has played for Highlanders and Azam.

He made his international debut in 2009, and was named in the squad for the 2017 Africa Cup of Nations.

References

1988 births
Living people
Zimbabwean footballers
Zimbabwe international footballers
Highlanders F.C. players
Azam F.C. players
Association football fullbacks
2017 Africa Cup of Nations players
Zimbabwean expatriate footballers
Zimbabwean expatriate sportspeople in Tanzania
Expatriate footballers in Tanzania
2021 Africa Cup of Nations players
Zimbabwe A' international footballers
2016 African Nations Championship players